Razdelna (Bulgarian: Разделна) is a village in Beloslav Municipality, Varna Province, north-eastern Bulgaria.

As of September 2015 the village had a population of 524.

References

Villages in Varna Province